Chinese cash may refer to:

 Chinese cash as a currency unit, a Chinese currency unit used on cash coins in imperial and early republican China
 Chinese cash as a coin, a Chinese copper coin used in imperial and early republican China
 Chinese cash as a unit of weight, equivalent to  tael or a currency equivalent to that weight in silver
 Any of the various other historical Chinese units of currency
 Yuan Renminbi, the present currency of the People's Republic of China
 New Taiwan dollar, the present currency of the Republic of China, also known as Taiwan